Ann Hamanalau Yoshida (born 10 October 1977) is an American paracanoeist who competes in international level events. As well as canoeing, she is an occupational therapist.

In 2000, Yoshida was paralysed from the chest down due to an accident in Utah when a truck went through a red light and hit her car. She had a brain injury and a ruptured aorta and was put into a medically induced coma to recover fully.

References

1977 births
Living people
Sportspeople from Hawaii
Paracanoeists of the United States
American female canoeists
Paracanoeists at the 2016 Summer Paralympics
21st-century American women